The Manila Stars are a professional basketball team in the Maharlika Pilipinas Basketball League (MPBL) and the Pilipinas Super League (PSL). The team is owned by the Local City Government of Manila, Philippines.

In the Pilipinas Super League, the team is known as the Manila City Stars.

History
Unlike Pasig and San Juan, the Manila Stars team does not share any history with a team in the defunct MBA including the Manila Metrostars. The team was ranked 13th in the MPBL Expansion.

The team tapped Cholo Villanueva as their head coach for 2021 MPBL Invitational.

Current roster

Head coaches

MPBL records

References

2018 establishments in the Philippines
Basketball teams established in 2018
Maharlika Pilipinas Basketball League teams
Sports in Manila
Sports teams in Metro Manila